scyllo-Inositol is one of the stereoisomers of inositol. It is also known as scyllitol, cocositol, quercinitol, and 1,3,5/2,4,6-hexahydroxycyclohexane.  scyllo-Inositol is a naturally occurring plant sugar alcohol found most abundantly in the coconut palm.

Biological effects 
Researchers at the University of Toronto have found that scyllo-inositol can block the development of amyloid-beta (Aβ) plaques in the brains of transgenic mice. scyllo-Inositol also reversed memory deficits, reduced the formation of Aβ plaques, and alleviated other symptoms that are associated with the accumulation of Aβ proteins in these mice.

Researchers at the Harvard Medical School-affiliated McLean Hospital identified that chronic users of anabolic steroids had statistically significantly lower levels of brain scyllo-inositol levels as compared to non-users.

Clinical evaluation 
scyllo-Inositol is under investigation by Transition Therapeutics as a disease-modifying therapy for Alzheimer's disease under the designation AZD-103. A patent was issued on April 21, 2009 claiming the use of scyllo-inositol for treating Alzheimer's disease. scyllo-Inositol is undergoing clinical investigation as an orally-administered therapeutic agent for the treatment of mild to moderate Alzheimer's disease. It has received fast track designation from the U.S. Food and Drug Administration. Transition has partnered with Elan Corporation on the development of the compound under the designation ELND005. ELND005 is currently in a Phase 2 clinical study, which completed enrollment in October 2008. The study is a randomized, double-blind, placebo-controlled, dose-ranging, safety and efficacy study in approximately 353 patients with mild to moderate Alzheimer's disease. The planned treatment period for each patient is approximately 18 months.

In December 2009, Elan and Transition jointly reported that the study has been modified so that only the 250 mg twice daily dose will be continued because of greater rates of adverse events, including 9 deaths, in the higher dose groups (1000 mg and 2000 mg dosed twice daily). Although the clinical trial helped establish the safety profile, the removal of the higher dose groups reduced the power of the study to establish efficacy.

See also
allo-Inositol
cis-Inositol
D-chiro-Inositol
epi-Inositol
L-chiro-Inositol
muco-Inositol
neo-Inositol

References

External links
 Drugs In Clinical Trials - ELND005

Inositol